FRQ may refer to:
 Farooqia railway station, in Pakistan
 Feature request
 Forak language
 Free-response question
 Frequency
 Frequency (gene)
 Rugby Quebec